Jean Faggion (28 September 1931 – 4 February 2020) was a French sports shooter. He competed at the 1972 Summer Olympics and the 1976 Summer Olympics.

References

External links
 

1931 births
2020 deaths
French male sport shooters
Olympic shooters of France
Shooters at the 1972 Summer Olympics
Shooters at the 1976 Summer Olympics
Place of birth missing